Scala is a former cinema turned nightclub and live music venue in Pentonville Road, London, England, near King's Cross railway station.

History
The Scala was originally built as a cinema to the designs of H Courtney Constantine, but construction was interrupted by the First World War and it spent some time being used to manufacture aircraft parts, and as a labour exchange for demobilised troops before opening in 1920 as the King's Cross Cinema. The cinema changed hands and names several times through its life and also changed focus, ranging from mainstream to art-house to adult film over 70 years, as well as spending a short time as a primatarium.

In the summer of 1972, the King's Cross Cinema played host to the only UK concert by Iggy & The Stooges, who were in London recording the album Raw Power. All photographs later featured in the Raw Power album sleeve (including the famous cover shot) were taken that night during the show by Mick Rock. The cover shot of the Lou Reed LP Transformer was also taken that summer at the venue by Rock as well.

Intended to be an alternative National Film Theatre, the Scala Film Club (which took its name from Scala House, its home on Tottenham Street) moved to this venue in 1981 under the management of Stephen Woolley. However, when the Scala showed the film A Clockwork Orange, then withdrawn from UK distribution, the copyright holder Warner Brothers sued at Kubrick's insistence, and won. As a result, Scala was almost rendered bankrupt and closed in 1993; however, the club was re-opened in 1999. The cinema had been refitted, with the lower seating area incorporating the new stage, DJ booth and dancefloor, while the upper seating area incorporated a second room and a DJ booth.

Scala now plays host to many eclectic club nights, and has featured live music acts including Jon Boden, The Midnight, Smoke Fairies, Shed Seven, The Libertines, Deftones, Slaves, Outlandish, London Elektricity, Coldplay, Tash Sultana, Foo Fighters, The Killers, Gorillaz, Big Talk, Moby, HIM, Wheatus, Adam Ant, Sheryl Crow, Sara Bareilles, Gavin DeGraw, Ray LaMontagne, Trampled by Turtles, Doomtree, Super Furry Animals, The Chemical Brothers, Avril Lavigne, Enslaved, Spandau Ballet, Gorgoroth, Lacuna Coil, Maroon 5, The Script, Melanie C, KLOQ, Gabrielle Aplin, Bastille, Wolf Alice, JAWS, Kaiser Chiefs, Jedi Mind Tricks, P!nk, Louis Tomlinson The Iterations and FEET.

Shock Around The Clock
In the 1980s, the Scala Cinema was known for its Shock Around The Clock horror all-nighters which would programme films such as The Living Dead at the Manchester Morgue and Martin. Shock Around The Clock would be a precursor to the London FrightFest Film Festival, which ran in the 21st Century at various cinemas in and around Leicester Square.

Alleged assault on Wargasm singer Sam Matlock 
Wargasm singer Sam Matlock stated that security staff at Scala had assaulted him, where the bouncers "dragged" him into the toilets, "slammed his head against the toilet seat" and "held his head in the toilet bowl". Scala banned the bouncers involved from the club.

Notes and references

External links
 – official site

1999 establishments in England
Buildings and structures in the London Borough of Camden
Music venues completed in 1999
Former cinemas in London
Scala
Tourist attractions in the London Borough of Camden
Theatres completed in 1911
1911 establishments in England